There are two Australian highways called the Flinders Highway.
Flinders Highway, South Australia
Flinders Highway, Queensland